The Old Donghe Bridge or Old Tungho Bridge is a bridge in Taitung County, Taiwan. It connects Chenggong Township and Donghe Township over Mawuku River.

History
The bridge was designed and built in 1926 by the Japanese under the name Jikuen Bridge as a suspension bridge. It was the longest bridge designed during the Japanese rule of Taiwan. In 1953, the bridge was rebuilt due to damage caused by typhoon by maintaining the original height of the towers at each end. Currently, the bridge is opened only for pedestrians.

Architecture
The bridge is 127 meters long and 4.65 meters wide made of concrete. At the northern end in Chenggong Township side, it has an arch-shaped pier and sits on top of hard limestone soil foundation. At the southern end in Donghe Township side, it has framed pier and sits on top of soft sedimentary rock foundation.

See also
 List of bridges in Taiwan

References

1926 establishments in Taiwan
Bridges completed in 1926
Bridges in Taitung County
Suspension bridges in Taiwan